Nixey is a surname. Notable people with the surname include:

Sarah Nixey (born 1973), British singer-songwriter
Troy Nixey (born 1972), Canadian comic book artist and film director
Catherine Nixey, author of the 2017 book The Darkening Age: The Christian Destruction of the Classical World

See also 
Nixey Callahan (1874–1934), American baseballer